Glentauchers distillery is a Speyside Scottish whisky distillery, founded in 1897. The building was designed by John Alcock, and overseen by Charles Doig & Son. It starting producing when James Buchanan Co. Ltd. and three members of Glentauchers Distillery Co. joined hands with Glentauchers a year after that. It was mothballed by United Distillers in 1985, and sold to Allied Distillers in 1989. Malts from this distillery are rarely bottled, usually, the produced whisky is used in blended whiskies. In 2000, an official bottling was released. This was a 15-year-old whisky. Before that a semi-official bottling was released by Gordon & MacPhail in the 1990s.

The distillery and the hamlet of Tauchers were served by Tauchers Platform railway station until 1964 with a freight siding also at one time running to the distillery.

References 

Distilleries in Scotland
1897 establishments in Scotland
Food and drink companies established in 1897